Don't Look Back: The Story of Leroy 'Satchel' Paige is a 1981 American made-for-television biographical film directed by Richard A. Colla and based on Leroy's autobiography, Don't Look Back : Satchel Paige in the Shadows of Baseball. It stars Louis Gossett Jr. and Beverly Todd.

Cast
Louis Gossett Jr. as Leroy 'Satchel' Page
Beverly Todd as Lahoma Brown
Cleavon Little as Rabbit
Ernie Barnes as Josh Gibson
Clifton Davis as Cool Papa Bell
Bubba Phillips as Coach Hardy
John Beradino as Jake Wells
Hal Williams as Roberts 
Jim Davis as Mr. Wilkenson
Ossie Davis as Chuffy Russell 
Taylor Lacher as Announcer
Tonea Stewart as Mama Paige (as Tommie Stewart)
J.R. Horne as Mr. Andrews
Donnie Walker as Sugar Boy Porter
Don Blakely as Bartender
Candy Ann Brown as Ramona  
Gloria Gifford as Darlene

References

External links

1981 television films
1981 films
1980s sports films
African-American biographical dramas
American baseball films
Films directed by Richard A. Colla
Films scored by Jack Elliott
Cultural depictions of baseball players
Cultural depictions of American men
Biographical films about sportspeople
Black people in art
ABC Motion Pictures films
Warner Bros. films
1980s English-language films
American drama television films
1980s American films